This was the nineteenth season for the competition, known from this season onwards as the Regal Trophy for sponsorship reasons.

Wigan won the final, beating Halifax by the score of 24–12 in the match was played at Headingley, Leeds. The attendance was 17,810 and receipts were £73688

Background 
This season saw two changes in the  existing members, and two new members, a new Chorley Borough (2) and an additional (now three in total) junior club
This brought the number of entrants up to thirty-eight
The  changes in details are :-
1 Mansfield Marksman changed their name to Nottingham City and moved to a new Harvey Hadden Stadium in Nottingham
2 York had been renamed as Ryedale-York and moved to the new Ryedale Stadium on the  outskirts of the  city
3 Chorley Borough re-formed, this time as Trafford Borough and moved out of Chorley and to Moss Lane the home ground of Altrincham F.C.
4 and this left a vacancy in Chorley which was filled by a newly formed club using the name of the recently departed club, yet another Chorley Borough (2)

Competition and results

Preliminary round 
Involved  6 matches and 12 Clubs

Round 1 - First  Round 
Involved  16 matches and 32 Clubs

Round 2 - Second  Round 
Involved  8 matches and 16 Clubs

Round 2 - Second  Round Replays 
Involved  1 match and 2 Clubs

Round 3 -Quarter Finals 
Involved 4 matches with 8 clubs

Round 3 -Quarter Finals - Replays 
Involved 1 match with 2 clubs

Round 4 – Semi-Finals 
Involved 2 matches and 4 Clubs

Final

Teams and scorers 

Scoring - Try = four points - Goal = two points - Drop goal = one point

Timeline in the  final

Prize money 
As part of the sponsorship deal and funds, the  prize money awarded to the competing teams for this season is as follows :-

The road to success 
This tree excludes any preliminary round fixtures

Notes and comments 
1 * Crossfields are a Junior (amateur) club from Warrington
2 * Score at half time was 8-8
3 * West Hull are a Junior (amateur) club from Hull
4 * Rothmans Yearbooks 1991–92 and 1991–92 and RUGBYLEAGUEproject give score as 28-14 but Wigan official archives gives it as 27-14
5 * Kells are a Junior (amateur) club from Cumbria
6 * The score at half time was 0-2
7 * The game was played at Whitehaven's ground
8 * This result is missing from the details given in RUGBYLEAGUEproject 
9 * This match played at Thrum Hall, home of Halifax - NOTE After the Hillsborough Stadium disaster Sheffield Eagles were unable to play at their home ground and during this season used 7 different venues as temporary "home" grounds
10 * At this time Fulham were a bit nomadic, using a collection of grounds as their "home", but the  likelihood was that this match was probably played at Chiswick Polytechnic Sports Ground
11 * This match played at Saltergate, the home of Chesterfield F.C. - NOTE After the Hillsborough Stadium disaster Sheffield Eagles were unable to play at their home ground and during this season used 7 different venues as temporary "home" grounds
12  * Headingley, Leeds, is the home ground of Leeds RLFC with a capacity of 21,000. The record attendance was  40,175 for a league match between Leeds and Bradford Northern on 21 May 1947.

General information for those unfamiliar 
The council of the Rugby Football League voted to introduce a new competition, to be similar to The Football Association and Scottish Football Association's "League Cup". It was to be a similar knock-out structure to, and to be secondary to, the Challenge Cup. As this was being formulated, sports sponsorship was becoming more prevalent and as a result John Player and Sons, a division of Imperial Tobacco Company, became sponsors, and the competition never became widely known as the "League Cup" 
The competition ran from 1971-72 until 1995–96 and was initially intended for the professional clubs plus the two amateur BARLA National Cup finalists. In later seasons the entries were expanded to take in other amateur and French teams. The competition was dropped due to "fixture congestion" when Rugby League became a summer sport
The Rugby League season always (until the onset of "Summer Rugby" in 1996) ran from around August-time through to around May-time and this competition always took place early in the season, in the Autumn, with the final usually taking place in late January 
The competition was variably known, by its sponsorship name, as the Player's No.6 Trophy (1971–1977), the John Player Trophy (1977–1983), the John Player Special Trophy (1983–1989), and the Regal Trophy in 1989.

See also 
1989–90 Rugby Football League season
1989 Lancashire Cup
1989 Yorkshire Cup
Regal Trophy
Rugby league county cups

References

External links
Saints Heritage Society
1896–97 Northern Rugby Football Union season at wigan.rlfans.com 
Hull&Proud Fixtures & Results 1896/1897
Widnes Vikings - One team, one passion Season In Review - 1896–97
The Northern Union at warringtonwolves.org
Huddersfield R L Heritage
Wakefield until I die

1989 in English rugby league
1990 in English rugby league
League Cup (rugby league)